The Venezuelan Football Federation ( or FVF) is the governing body of football in Venezuela. It was founded in 1925 and affiliated in 1952. It is a member of CONMEBOL as well as FIFA, and is in charge of the Venezuela national football team.

Copa America 2007
Venezuela was selected as the host of the Copa América 2007. The FVF and CONMEBOL were responsible of many aspects of the organisation and logistics of the tournament.

Association staff

Executive Board 

 President: Jorge Giménez Ochoa
 1st Vice-President: Pedro Infante Aparicio
 2nd Vice-President: Jose Antonio Quintero
 3rd Vice-President: Akram Almatni
 Secretary: David Quintanilla
 Director: Suying Olivares
 Director: Oscar Linares
 Director: Juan Carlos Copa
 Director: Reina Suarez
 Director: Miguel Mea Vitali
 Director: Oscar Cunto
 Director: Adrian Aguirre
 Referee Board: Miguel Buitriago
 Honor Council: Consuelo Vasquez
 Electoral Commission: Edgar Morales
 Press Officer: Salomón Rondón

References

External links
  
 Venezuela at FIFA

Venezuela
Football in Venezuela
Football
Sports organizations established in 1926
1926 establishments in Venezuela